The Inter Baku 2011–12 season was Inter Baku's eleventh Azerbaijan Premier League season, and their third season under manager Kakhaber Tskhadadze. They finished the season in 3rd place, qualifying for the 2012–13 UEFA Europa League, entering at the First qualifying round. They also participated in the 2011–12 Azerbaijan Cup, losing to Neftchi Baku in the semi finals.

Squad 

 (captain)

Transfers

Summer

In:

 

Out:

Winter

In:

Out:

Competitions

Azerbaijan Premier League

Results summary

Results by round

Results

Notes
Match Abandoned in the 94th minute, at 0–0. Match awarded 0–3

Table

Azerbaijan Premier League Championship Group

Results summary

Results by round

Results

Table

Azerbaijan Cup

Notes
Match Abandoned after Turan refused to restart the game after conceding a disputed goal, Match awarded 3–0

Squad statistics

Appearances and goals

|-
|colspan="14"|Players away from Inter Baku on loan:

|-
|colspan="14"|Players who appeared for Inter Baku no longer at the club:

|}

Goal scorers

Disciplinary record

Awards

Player of the Month

Team kit
These are the 2011–12 Inter Baku kits.

|
|

References

External links 
 Inter Baku at Soccerway.com

Inter Baku
Shamakhi FK seasons